Gabriel Aresti Segurola (October 14, 1933 – June 5, 1975) was one of the most important writers and poets in Basque language in the 20th century.

He grew up in Bilbao, which was a Spanish-speaking environment. Although his father talked to his parents in Basque language, the child Gabriel did not have Basque as mother language. He was a self-taught student of the language, at the age of 21 he collaborated in some magazines. His literary career began with a work influenced by the symbolism, Maldan Behera (Downhill). His most important works are, however, Harri eta Herri (Stone and Country, 1964), Euskal Harria (The Basque Stone, 1968) and Harrizko Herri Hau (This Country of Stone, 1971), related to the social realism. He also cultivated other genres, like the novel, the short story and theatre. He was an excellent translator of Basque; he translated authors like Federico García Lorca, T. S. Eliot and Giovanni Boccaccio.

Very critical and controversial, he published many articles, which brought him problems not only with Franco's regime but also with some of the mainstream Basque nationalism tendencies, because of his leftist social ideas. Gabriel Aresti was one of the greatest inspirers of the modern culture in Basque language (though he always found the sources in the popular culture and the daily talking, opposing to the purists of the language), and as a Member of the  Academy of the Basque language, he defended the unified Basque language, which he also used before it was adopted by the Academy in 1968. He founded the publishing house Lur, allowing new authors in the Basque language like Ramon Saizarbitoria, Arantxa Urretabizkaia or Xabier Lete to publish their first works.

External links
  Azurmendi, Joxe 1985: Aresti: sentsibilitate konkretu bat, Jakin, 36: 5-30.
  Azurmendi, Joxe 1991: Arestiren tintazko bataioaz, Jakin, 62: 129-142.
  Poems of Gabriel Aresti

1933 births
1975 deaths
People from Bilbao
Basque-language writers
Basque-language poets
20th-century Spanish poets